Frak or FRAK may refer to:
 Frak (expletive), a profanity from Battlestar Galactica
 Frak or Kapoteh, a coat worn by some Jewish Orthodox men instead of a bekishe
 Frak!, a 1984 computer game
 FRAK (engine), a JavaScript library/API for creating interactive 3D applications using WebGL
 Vladimír Frák, Czech skier

See also
 Frac (disambiguation)
 Frack (disambiguation)
 Frakk, a fictional Hungarian cartoon character
 Phrack, an ezine